The action of 29 September 1662 took place between Kos and Kalimnos, Greece, when a Venetian fleet attacked and defeated the regular Turkish cargo fleet and its escort which were on their way to Alexandria.

Ships involved

Venice
?

Ottomans
Tre Naranceri 40 - Burnt
Gran Duca - Captured
San Carlo/Filippoto - Captured
? (pink) - Captured
13 other ships
5 galleys
36 saiks - 28 sunk or captured

References
 

Conflicts in 1662
1662
1662 in the Ottoman Empire
17th century in Greece
History of the Dodecanese